In baseball, completing the cycle is the accomplishment of hitting a single, a double, a triple, and a home run in the same game. Collecting the hits in that order is known as a "natural cycle", which has occurred five times in Nippon Professional Baseball (NPB). The cycle itself is rare in NPB, occurring 76 times since Fumio Fujimura's first cycle during the single league era in 1948. In terms of frequency, the cycle is roughly as common as a no-hitter (90 occurrences in NPB history); Baseball Digest calls it "one of the rarest feats in baseball". Hitting for the cycle was not recognized in Japanese professional baseball until former Major League Baseball (MLB) player Daryl Spencer made a remark about it after hitting for the cycle with the Hankyu Braves in 1965. Of the 12 current NPB teams, only the Tohoku Rakuten Golden Eagles have never had at least one player hit for the cycle.

The most cycles hit by a player in Nippon Professional Baseball is three, accomplished by Bobby Rose. Playing for the Yokohama BayStars, Rose hit his first cycle on May 2, 1995, the next on April 29, 1997, and his final cycle on June 30, 1999. Other than Rose, only three other NPB players have hit multiple cycles: Fumio Fujimura with the Osaka Tigers and Hiromi Matsunaga with the Hankyu/Orix Braves and Kosuke Fukudome with the Chunichi Dragons and the Hanshin Tigers, all with two. Fujimura is also the only player to have hit a cycle during both the single league era and the current dual league era. The 2003 NPB season saw the most cycles hit in a single season—five. That season also saw the only instance of cycles occurring in two different games on the same day: on July 1, hit by Atsunori Inaba of the Yakult Swallows and Arihito Muramatsu of the Fukuoka Daiei Hawks. The next day, Shinjiro Hiyama became the third player to hit for the cycle in two days. Conversely, the longest period of time between two players hitting for the cycle is one day shy of 6 years. The drought has lasted from Michihiro Ogasawara's cycle in 2008 until Rainel Rosario's in 2014.

No player has ever hit a cycle in both the Central and Pacific Leagues; however, after Alex Ochoa hit his cycle with the Dragons on April 13, 2004, he became the only player to hit a cycle in both MLB and NPB. Ochoa hit his first and only cycle in the MLB eight years prior on July 3, 1996, while playing for the New York Mets. Swallows catcher Atsuya Furuta is the only player to hit for the cycle in an NPB All-Star game, hitting one in game 2 of the 1992 series. Furuta's cycle is not considered an official NPB cycle as it occurred during an exhibition game. Inaba is the only player to hit for the cycle in a rain-shortened game. After hitting a triple in the first inning and hitting a home run in the fourth, Inaba collected the other two necessary hits in a seven-run fifth inning when the order batted around. Six players achieved their cycles by acquiring a required hit during extra innings. Kosuke Fukudome is the only player to have hit a grand slam as the home run of the cycle. Hiroshi Ohshita and Kazuhiko Kondo are the only two players to have hit a walk-off home run to win the game as the final hit of their cycles.

Cycles by player

Cycles by franchise

See also

List of Major League Baseball players to hit for the cycle

References
General

Inline citations

Nippon Professional Baseball lists